The Collinsville Masonic Temple is a historic Masonic building located in Collinsville, Illinois. It houses Collinsville Lodge No. 712, A.F. & A.M, which was established in 1872 as the city's chapter of the Freemasons. The building was constructed in 1912; prior to then, the Masons had met in rented buildings. The Classical Revival building's front facade features a brick entablature and pediment supported by four two-story Doric columns. The Masonic Temple is the oldest fraternal meeting house in Collinsville which is still used by the organization which built it.

The building was listed on the National Register of Historic Places in 2005.

References

Clubhouses on the National Register of Historic Places in Illinois
National Register of Historic Places in Madison County, Illinois
Neoclassical architecture in Illinois
Masonic buildings completed in 1912
Buildings and structures in Madison County, Illinois
Masonic buildings in Illinois
1912 establishments in Illinois